Premalo... Pavani Kalyan is a 2002 Indian Telugu-language romantic drama film directed by Polur Ghatika Chalam and starring Deepak and Ankitha.

Cast 

Deepak as Kalyan
Ankitha as Pavani
Sunil
Kota Srinivasa Rao as Sitarama Raju 
Ranganath as Dasaratha 
Jayaprakash Reddy as Jayaprakash 
Giribabu
Brahmanandam
Ali 
A.V.S.
Venu Madhav
M. S. Narayana
Raghunatha Reddy
Gundu Hanumantha Rao
Ironleg Sastri
Kallu Chidambaram
Varsha
Ramaprabha
 Ramyasri
 Devisri
 Anitha
Madhumati
Apoorva

Production 
The film is directed by Polur Ghatika Chalam, who wrote the story for Sampangi (2001) starring Deepak. The film is produced by Super Hit film magazine editor B. A. Raju.

Release
The film released on 13 December 2002.

Reception
Gudipoodi Srihari of The Hindu opined that "BREAKING THE monotony of the campus love stories, this film proves a refreshing drama of love, coupled with family sentiments and friendly relationships. It is a carefully crafted work of director Ghatikachalam". Jeevi of Idlebrain.com said that "The only plus point of the film is music. The primary drawbacks of the film are dull narration and nativity problem of hero. May be you can watch this film at your leisure". A critic from Sify wrote that "Deepak is wooden-faced throughout while Ankitha looks glamorous. The music of Gantadi Krishna is disappointing. On the whole it is a run-off-the-mill love story with a tame climax".

Box office 
The film ran for a hundred days despite a slow start.

References

Notes